Shaanxi Coal and Chemical Industry Group Co., Ltd. (former name: Shaanxi Coal Industry Group) is a coal company based in Xi'an, China.  , it was the third largest coal company in China. , the Group owns or has shares in nearly 60 enterprises with total of 136,000 employees.  Its main subsidiary is Shaanxi Coal Industry.

In 2011, it ranked 158th among China top 500 enterprises and 35th among Chinese top 200 most efficient enterprises and first among Shaanxi's most efficient enterprises. In the 2020 Forbes Global 2000, Shaanxi Coal Industry, a subsidiary of Shaanxi Coal Chemical Industry, was ranked as the 805th -largest public company in the world.

In addition to operations in China, the group has invested in a fertilizer plant in Argentina and plans to invest in a coal mine in Australia.

References

External links

 
China Coal Production - Location and Major Companies 2016 Link is dead on 2020-02-20.

Companies based in Xi'an
Coal companies of China